Alex Ball (born 4 August 1981) is a footballer who played in The Football League for Bristol City. Ball was a youth academy coach at Southampton after joining from his post as Head of youth development at Bristol City. Ball has more recently been part of the first team coaching set up at Bristol City FC having spent a number of years working with the U23's in assistant and head coach positions.

Career
His only appearance for City came in a 2–0 defeat away at cross city rivals Bristol Rovers at the end of the 1999–2000 season. He was released in 2001 and has since played for non-league sides Clevedon Town, Team Bath, Mangotsfield United and Paulton Rovers. He has also coached at Bristol City's academy and at the Bristol Academy of Sport.

References

External links

English footballers
Bristol City F.C. players
English Football League players
1981 births
Living people
Association football defenders